James Elmer Gantner (born January 5, 1953) is a former Major League Baseball player who spent his entire career with the Milwaukee Brewers (1976–92).

Background
Gantner grew up in Eden, Wisconsin, and attended Campbellsport High School in nearby Campbellsport. He played his college baseball at the University of Wisconsin–Oshkosh, where he was enshrined into the Titans' Hall of Fame in 1984.

Baseball career
Gantner was a 12th-round draft pick in the 1974 amateur draft. Gantner spent two years in the minor leagues before being called up to the majors. He was best known for his consistent play, which culminated in a respectable .274 career batting average after 17 seasons. Gantner, or "Gumby" as he was affectionately known because of the way he turned double plays, was the second baseman for the Brewers, who won the American League pennant in  but fell in seven games to the St. Louis Cardinals in the World Series. Gantner scored the go-ahead and ultimate winning run in the bottom of the seventh inning of the fifth and decisive game of the ALCS, scoring behind Charlie Moore on Cecil Cooper's RBI single. He comprised a stellar infield throughout much of the 1980s beside Hall of Famers Robin Yount at shortstop and Paul Molitor at third base, and Cooper at first base.

Gantner rarely hit home runs. On September 3, he hit his first home run since 1987, ending a streak of 1,762 at-bats without one. Gantner's last career home run came on August 14, in the 13th inning, against Boston Red Sox reliever Jeff Reardon. Gantner hit the first pitch into the right field bleachers in Milwaukee County Stadium, giving the Brewers an 8-7 victory. Brewers announcer Bob Uecker had the call with, "Here's the pitch to Gantner. He hits one to right and deep. Get up. Get up. Get outta here - gone! A dinger for Klinger! And this game is over. Woah, Jimmy Gantner!"

Gantner pitched an inning of relief against the Kansas City Royals on August 29, 1979, allowing two hits. Despite the game being a blowout, he was almost ejected for arguing balls and strikes with the umpire.

In his rookie season, Gantner pinch-ran for Hank Aaron in Aaron's final Major League game on October 3, .

Gantner was elected to the Wisconsin Athletic Hall of Fame in 2005.

Coaching career

Gantner coached several years after he retired as a player. He was a silent partner of Hale Park Automotive Services in Hales Corners, Wisconsin. He also is employed by the Brewers' organization. Jim also is partial owner of a bar in Eden, Wisconsin, called "Scuds Buds."

Gantner entered his first season as field manager of the Wisconsin Woodchucks in the Northwoods League in 2007.

Career statistics

Hitting

He had a career .985 fielding percentage at second base and a .956 fielding percentage at third base, his two primary positions.

See also
List of Major League Baseball players who spent their entire career with one franchise

References

External links

Sportspeople from Fond du Lac, Wisconsin
Milwaukee Brewers players
1953 births
Baseball players from Wisconsin
Major League Baseball second basemen
Living people
Milwaukee Brewers coaches
Major League Baseball first base coaches
Wisconsin–Oshkosh Titans baseball players
People from Eden, Wisconsin
People from Hales Corners, Wisconsin
Beloit Brewers players
Berkshire Brewers players
Denver Zephyrs players
Newark Co-Pilots players
Spokane Indians players
Thetford Mines Miners players
American expatriate baseball players in Canada